Draelon Burns (born October 7, 1985) is an American professional basketball player for Shinshu Brave Warriors in Japan. Standing at 6 ft 5 in (1.96 m), he primarily plays as point guard or shooting guard.

Playing career
Burns joined Úrvalsdeild karla club Keflavík in January 2010 and went on to average 21.2 points and 4.2 assists in 10 regular season games. He helped Keflavík to the Úrvalsdeild finals in April that year but ankle injuries in game two forced him to miss the rest of the series which Keflavík lost 2–3 against Snæfell.

Career statistics

bj League

|-
| align="left" |  2011–12
| align="left" | Yokohama B-Corsairs
| 24 || 18 || 24.1 || .453 || .336 || .694 || 3.7 || 2.7 || 1.3 || 0.2 ||  12.8
|-
| align="left" |  2012–13
| align="left" | Yokohama
| 47 || 6 || 28.7 || .439 || .381 || .820 || 6.6 || 4.8 || 2.0 || 0.2 || 21.4 
|-
| align="left" |  2013–14
| align="left" | Ryukyu Golden Kings
| 42 || 5 || 28.2 || .400 || .384 || .759 || 5.7 || 3.4 || 1.1 || 0.3 ||  17.0
|-
| align="left" |  2014–15
| align="left" | Ryukyu
| 48 || 1 || 26.2 || .441 || .387 || .778 || 4.5 || 2.2 || 3.0 || 0.2 ||  15.1
|-
| align="left" |  2015–16
| align="left" | Ryukyu
| 52 || 21 || 23.0 || .396 || .341 || .837 || 5.4 || 3.4 || 0.9 || 0.3 ||  12.8
|-

References

External links
Icelandic statistics at kki.is

1985 births
Living people
American expatriate basketball people in Germany
American expatriate basketball people in Israel
American expatriate basketball people in Japan
Basketball players from Milwaukee
DePaul Blue Demons men's basketball players
Earth Friends Tokyo Z players
Ironi Kiryat Ata players
Nishinomiya Storks players
Ryukyu Golden Kings players
Shinshu Brave Warriors players
Sioux Falls Skyforce players
Yokohama B-Corsairs players
Keflavík men's basketball players
Úrvalsdeild karla (basketball) players
American men's basketball players
Guards (basketball)